Malcolm Pirnie Sr. (February 6, 1889 – February 23, 1967) was an American civil and consulting engineer, pioneer in sanitary engineering, founder of Malcolm Pirnie, Inc., and president of the American Society of Civil Engineers in 1944.

Pirnie was born in 1889 in New York City as son of George Pirnie and Florence Augusta (Pomeroy) Pirnie. He studied civil engineering at Harvard University, where he obtained his BSc in 1910, and his MA in 1911. After graduation in 1911 he started his career as assistant engineer at the New York City consulting firm Hazen and Whipple, where in 1916 he became partner and the company was renamed Hazen, Everett & Pirnie. In 1929 he started his own engineering firm Malcolm Pirnie, Inc. In 1946 he founded Malcolm Pirnie Engineers with four partners.

In 1944 Pirnie served as president of the American Society of Civil Engineers. In 1945 he was awarded the honorary Doctor of Engineering by the Rensselaer Polytechnic Institute, and in 1948 he was awarded the annual Hoover Medal. His son, Malcolm Pirnie Jr. (1920–1997), followed in his footsteps as chairman of the consulting firm Malcolm Pirnie Inc.

Selected publications 
 Malcolm Pirnie. Present and future water supply for the city of Jacksonville, Fla., 1927.

References 

1889 births
1967 deaths
American civil engineers
Harvard School of Engineering and Applied Sciences alumni
People from New York City
Engineers from New York City